Do Re Mi is a 1966 Malaysian comedy film directed by and starring P. Ramlee. The concept was partly based on the idea of The Three Stooges with Ramlee playing the character Do. Its success led to two sequels, Nasib Do Re Mi (also 1966) and Laksamana Do Re Mi (1972), Ramlee's last film before his death.

Synopsis
A musical film that portrays three comical men whose adventures creates satirical laughter.

Cast 
 P. Ramlee as Do
 A. R. Tompel as Re
 Ibrahim Din as Mi
 Wan Chik Daud as Milah
 Noran Nordin as Midah
 Rohaya Rahman as Minah
 Mahmud June as Do's father in-law
 Minah Hashim as Do's mother in-law
 Sharif Babu as Cetti
 Usman Eot as Debt Collector
 Bakar M as Landlord
 Idris Hashim as Rich Man
 A.K Jailani as Ahli Mesyuarat Tingkap
 Ahmad Dadida as Pak 'Jebon'
 Saloma as Buloh Inn's singer
 Karim Latiff as Buloh Inn's visitor
 Yusof Bujang as Penyamun Long Ranger

References

External links 
 

1966 films
Malaysian comedy films